Swoyersville is a borough in Luzerne County, Pennsylvania, United States. The population was 5,008 at the 2020 census. Swoyersville is located within the Wyoming Valley West School District.

History
The community was originally called Swoyerville; it was incorporated as a borough in 1888. The community was named after mine owner John Henry Swoyer. In the 1950s, the town held a special vote on whether to add an "s" to the borough's name. The measure passed and the borough became Swoyersville.

Coal mining was the chief industry in and around Swoyersville for most of the 19th and 20th centuries. The mines ceased production in the 1950s (after the Knox Mine Disaster). However, work continued at the colliery on Main Street (in Swoyersville) well into the 1960s. In 1972, the town was severely flooded by the Susquehanna River as a result of Hurricane Agnes.  At the time, there was great concern that many of the flooded abandoned mine tunnels — running underneath Swoyersville — would cave-in.  However, the cave-ins never occurred.

Geography

Swoyersville's terrain is flat in the south, with the northern part of the borough being hilly. The majority of the borough's land is urban, with some forest in the north. 

A massive pile of coal ash as high as a 17-story building is in the town, surrounded by homes. The pile is enough to fill 26,000 rail cars, and the mayor Christopher Concert advocates for it to be hauled away, if state and federal funding can be secured, even though he used it for sledding in the winter as a child.

Demographics

As of the census of 2000, there were 5,157 people, 2,243 households, and 1,484 families residing in the borough. The population density was 2,386.4 people per square mile (921.8/km2). There were 2,356 housing units at an average density of 1,090.3 per square mile (421.1/km2). The racial makeup of the borough was 99.22% White, 0.10% African American, 0.06% Native American, 0.16% Asian, 0.08% from other races, and 0.39% from two or more races. Hispanic or Latino of any race were 0.16% of the population.

There were 2,243 households, out of which 24.0% had children under the age of 18 living with them, 51.5% were married couples living together, 11.1% had a female householder with no husband present, and 33.8% were non-families. 31.0% of all households were made up of individuals, and 17.5% had someone living alone who was 65 years of age or older. The average household size was 2.30 and the average family size was 2.88.

In the borough the age distribution of the population shows 18.5% under the age of 18, 6.6% from 18 to 24, 26.7% from 25 to 44, 24.7% from 45 to 64, and 23.4% who were 65 years of age or older. The median age was 44 years. For every 100 females there were 89.4 males. For every 100 females age 18 and over, there were 86.4 males.

The median income for a household in the borough was $30,434, and the median income for a family was $39,188. Males had a median income of $29,101 versus $26,304 for females. The per capita income for the borough was $16,449. About 10.4% of families and 10.8% of the population were below the poverty line, including 19.3% of those under age 18 and 6.5% of those age 65 or over.

Notable people

Adam Comorosky, Pittsburgh Pirates and Cincinnati Reds outfielder
Harry Dorish, MLB pitcher with the Boston Red Sox, St. Louis Browns, Baltimore Orioles and Chicago White Sox
Jim Hettes, UFC fighter
Joe Holup, forward for the NBA's Syracuse Nationals and Detroit Pistons
Lou Michaels, former kicker for the Baltimore Colts
Walt Michaels, former head coach of the New York Jets
Dick Mulligan, former Major League Baseball pitcher
John Paluck, former DE with the Washington Redskins
Packy Rogers, infielder with the Brooklyn Dodgers
Steve Shemo, former Major League Baseball second baseman
Fred Shupnik, former Democratic member of the Pennsylvania House of Representatives
Chuck Sieminski, former American football player

References

External links

Populated places established in 1888
Boroughs in Luzerne County, Pennsylvania